"Quelqu'un que j'aime, quelqu'un qui m'aime" (meaning "Someone I Love, Someone Who Loves Me") is the fourth promotional single from Celine Dion's 1991 French-language album, Dion chante Plamondon. It was released in Canada in August 1992. "Quelqu'un que j'aime, quelqu'un qui m'aime" was one of four new songs on Dion chante Plamondon, written by Luc Plamondon. Erown composed the music. The track was produced by Jannick Top and Serge Perathoner. It reached number one in Quebec and was nominated for the Félix Award for Most Popular Song of the Year.

Background
There was no music video for the single made. At that time Dion was focused on promoting her new English album called Celine Dion (1992).

"Quelqu'un que j'aime, quelqu'un qui m'aime" became a hit in Quebec, Canada reaching number 1 position for seven straight weeks. It entered the chart on 29 August 1992 and spent twenty three weeks on it.

The song was nominated for the Félix Award for Most Popular Song of the Year.

Dion performed the song for the first and only time during her appearance on the Sonia Benezra's Show on 16 February 1993.

Formats and track listings
Canadian promotional CD single
"Quelqu'un que j'aime, quelqu'un qui m'aime" – 3:40

Charts

References

1991 songs
1992 singles
Celine Dion songs
Columbia Records singles
Epic Records singles
French-language songs
Songs with lyrics by Luc Plamondon